L.J.D. College, Falta, established in 2015, is an undergraduate college under the chairmanship of Gopal Das located in Punya, Falta, South 24 Parganas district. This college is affiliated to University of Calcutta.

Departments
 Arts
 Commerce
 Science

See also 
List of colleges affiliated to the University of Calcutta
Education in India
Education in West Bengal

References

External links
 

University of Calcutta affiliates
Universities and colleges in South 24 Parganas district
Educational institutions established in 2015
2015 establishments in West Bengal